The 20/577 Alexander Henry, also known as 20/577 Express, is an obsolete rifle cartridge.

Overview
The 20/577 Alexander Henry was developed and introduced by the Scottish gunmaker Alexander Henry around 1895 exclusively for his hunting rifles.

The 20/577 Alexander Henry is a rimmed, bottlenecked centerfire rifle cartridge.  The 20/577 Alexander Henry is derived from brass 20 bore cartridges necked down to accept a  calibre bullet like the .577 Black Powder Express.

Later versions were loaded with mild loadings of cordite, carefully balanced through trial to replicate the ballistics of the blackpowder version, a copper-tubed lead bullet was also available, offering improved performance against dangerous game.

See also
 Express cartridges
 List of rifle cartridges
 13 mm caliber

References

External links
 Royal Armouries, "Centrefire rifle proof cartridge - .577 in Henry by Eley (1900)", collections.royalarmouries.org, retrieved 17 July 2018.

Pistol and rifle cartridges
British firearm cartridges
Weapons and ammunition introduced in 1895